Masaya Notomi from the NTT Basic Research Laboratories, Atsugi, Kanagawa, Japan was named Fellow of the Institute of Electrical and Electronics Engineers (IEEE) in 2013 for leadership in the development of photonic crystals and applications.

References

Fellow Members of the IEEE
Living people
Year of birth missing (living people)
Place of birth missing (living people)